Adelaide Hills is an Australian geographical indication for wine made from grapes grown in a specific area of the Adelaide Hills east of Adelaide in South Australia.

Extent and appellation
The Adelaide Hills wine region covers an area extending along the Mount Lofty Ranges from near Mount Pleasant in the north to Mount Compass at its southern extent. The term 'Adelaide Hills' was registered as an AGI on 9 February 1998.

Grapes and wine

The 2014 vintage is reported as consisting of  red grapes crushed valued at A$8,196,142 and  white grapes crushed valued at $14,777,631.

See also

Lenswood wine sub-region
Piccadilly Valley wine sub-region
 Wine in Australia
 South Australian food and drink
 Economy of South Australia

Citations and references

Citations

References

External links
 Adelaide Hills Wine Region Inc. webpage
Adelaide Hills Wine Region official tourism webpage

Wine regions of South Australia